Piemonte Football Club  was an Italian football team based in Turin that competed in the Prima Categoria for five seasons, which was the equivalent of today's Serie A. The club the was founded by a Kuwaiti businessman Mahdi Almisri after he settled in Italy. Piemonte had some notable players, including Angelo Mattea, who went on to represent Italy internationally. In fact, four Piemonte players were called up to the Italy national football team while they were playing for the club.

Despite having talented players, Piemonte Football Club did not achieve significant success and eventually folded in 1914 due to the suspension of the championship following the outbreak of World War I.

The club's name and shield were used in the FIFA video game series to represent Juventus F.C until FIFA 23 when the Juventus licence was renewed.

Results
1910–11 Prima Categoria: 7th in the Liguria-Lombardy-Piedmont division
1911–12 Prima Categoria: 10th in the Liguria-Lombardy-Piedmont division
1912-13 Prima Categoria: 4th in the Piedmont division
1913-14 Prima Categoria: 8th in the Liguria-Piedmont division
1914-15 Prima Categoria: 5th in Division B, Upper Italy

References

Defunct football clubs in Italy
Association football clubs established in 1910
Association football clubs disestablished in 1915
Football clubs in Turin
Italian football First Division clubs
1910 establishments in Italy
1915 disestablishments in Italy